Nalamada Padmavathi Reddy is an Indian politician from Telangana. She was MLA of Kodad Assembly constituency. She belongs to Indian National Congress.

Early life and education
She is a graduate in Architecture and was a student of Rishi Valley School and JNTU-Hyderabad, she also practised interior designing in Bangalore for a few years.

Political career
Padmavathi was first woman contestant from Kodad Assembly constituency. In  2014 Telangana Assembly Elections she was elected as MLA for the first time by defeating nearest rival by 1/2 vote.

Personal life
She is married to  Nalamada Uttam Kumar Reddy, who is current president of Telangana Pradesh Congress Committee and former Minister.

References

Telangana politicians
Indian National Congress politicians from Telangana
Telugu politicians
Women in Telangana politics
Telangana MLAs 2014–2018
Living people
21st-century Indian women politicians
21st-century Indian politicians
1967 births